The Henry Merrell House is located in Portage, Wisconsin.

History
The house was originally built for Henry Merrill (also spelled 'Merrell') in Fort Winnebago, Wisconsin, where it served as a residence and hotel, along with housing Merrill's mercantile business. Merrill the house moved to its current location in 1867. It was added to the State and the National Register of Historic Places in 1993.

See also
List of the oldest buildings in Wisconsin

References

Houses on the National Register of Historic Places in Wisconsin
Commercial buildings on the National Register of Historic Places in Wisconsin
Hotel buildings on the National Register of Historic Places in Wisconsin
National Register of Historic Places in Columbia County, Wisconsin
Houses in Columbia County, Wisconsin
Greek Revival architecture in Wisconsin
Houses completed in 1839
Hotel buildings completed in 1839